Mizanur Rahman Shelley (2 January 1943 – 12 August 2019) was a minister of Government of Bangladesh, political analyst, political scientist and educationalist.

Biography
Shelley was born on 2 January 1943 in Munshiganj District's Kusumpur Village. After completing study from University of Dhaka he joined its Political Science Department as a teacher. In 1967, he resigned from the post and joined Government Service. After joining Government Service he obtained a PhD from the University of London in International Politics. He resigned from Government Service in 1980. He was the Director of Social Welfare Department at that time. He served as Minister of Information Ministry and Water Resources Ministry in 1990.

Shelley was the Founding Chairman of the Center for Development Research Bangladesh and editor of Asian Affairs. He was also the Chairman of Premier Leasing and Finance. He was the Advisory Editor of Weekly Sochitro Swadesh and Trust Chairman of the Bangladesh Times. His writings were published in national dailies of Bangladesh. He wrote books about sociology and politics. He also wrote books covering other topics. In 2008 he received an honorary fellowship from the Bangla Academy.

Shelley was married to Sufia Rahman. She died in 2016. They had two sons. Their names are Tahmid Ibne Mizan and Arif Ibne Mizan.

Shelley died in Bangabandhu Sheikh Mujib Medical University Hospital of Dhaka on 12 August 2019 at the age of 76.

References

1943 births
2019 deaths
People from Munshiganj District
University of Dhaka alumni
Alumni of the University of London
Academic staff of the University of Dhaka
Information ministers of Bangladesh
Water Resources ministers
Honorary Fellows of Bangla Academy
Bangladeshi male writers
Bangladeshi political scientists
St. Gregory's High School and College alumni